Zviad Ratiani (born 5 January 1971, in Tbilisi) is a Georgian poet and translator.

Biography 
Zviad Ratiani was born in 1971 in Tbilisi, Georgia.

Ratiani has been contributing to the Georgian literary printed media since 1992. He has published five poetry collections and simultaneously has intensively worked on translations of English and German poetry.

Among numerous translations Zviad Ratiani has introduced to Georgian readers are such significant ones as poetic works by T.S. Eliot, E. Pound, R. Frost, M. Rilke and Paul Celan, for the last one Ratiani received the Goethe Institute Prize for the best translation of the year.

In 2005 Ratiani was praised with top literary award SABA of Georgia.

Ratiani’s poems have been translated into English, German, French, Russian, Azerbaijani, Ukrainian, Latvian, and other languages. His poetry has been published in several anthologies among them: Ich aber will dem Kaukasos zu... - Pop Verlag 2015, Germany; Aus der Ferne (Neue Georgische Lyrik), Corvinus Presse 2016, Germany.

Works

Books
 Only You are Allowed, Diogene Publishing, 2015
 The Negative, Diogene Publishing, 2009
 The Roads and the Days, Arete Publishing, 2005
 The Pocket Air, Bakur Sulakauri Publishing, 2000
 The Whisper Tutorial, Lomisi Publishing House, 1994
 Invent Me, Lomisi Publishing House, 1993

Translations
 T.S. Eliot - The Waste Land, Tbilisi, Intlekti Publishing House, 2013,

Prizes and awards
 Literary prize LITERA in the category The Best Poetry Collection for Only You are Allowed, 2016 
 Literary Award SABA in category the best poetry collection for The Negative, 2010
 VAZHA PSHAVELA festival prize for the book Roads and Days, 2005
 ARILI magazine prize for book-length poem Moving Target, 2000
 Literary prize BESTSELLER for the poem Fathers, 1999
 Georgian Writer’s Union prize in 1996 and 1998 in the category The Best Poetry Publication of the Year

References

External links
 RATIANI ZVIAD
 ONLY YOU ARE ALLOWED
 Ratiani, Zviad
 to Tadeusz Dobrowski

Male poets from Georgia (country)
Poets from Georgia (country)
1971 births
Living people
Translators from Georgia (country)